Holidays in Norway

References 
 KalenderNorge.no – Norwegian calendar with overview of Norwegian public holidays 
 Norskkalender.no
 Webkalenderen.no
 Timeanddate.com/norsk/

 
Norwegian culture
Society of Norway
Norway
Lists of events in Norway

nn:Heilagdag